Jeholornithidae is a family of avialan theropods whose taxonomy is controversial, whose remains are found in fossil deposits of what is now China. The controversy stems from whether most of the taxa in the group are just specimens of Jeholornis, as well as if the group is monophyletic at all. In the description of Kompsornis the authors Wang et al. (2020) found moderate support in the monophyly of the group, placing them as basal avialans sister to Pygostylia. No phylogenetic definitions for these groups were provided by Zhou and Zhang, but a topological definition was provided in 2020 by Wang and colleagues where Jeholornithiformes was defined as "the most inclusive clade containing Je. prima but excluding the extant birds".

The results of a phylogenetic analysis of all valid jeholornithiform species considered by Wang and colleagues is shown below:

References

Prehistoric avialans
Prehistoric dinosaur families
Early Cretaceous dinosaurs of Asia
Taxa named by Zhou Zhonghe